The 2021 Pacific-Asia Curling Championships was held from November 7 to 13 at the Almaty Arena in Almaty, Kazakhstan. The top men's team and the top two women's teams qualified for the 2022 World Men's Curling Championship and 2022 World Women's Curling Championship respectively. The next two placed teams of each gender qualified for the World Qualification Event, for a second chance to qualify for the World Curling Championships.

Men

Teams

The teams are listed as follows:

Round-robin standings
Final round-robin standings

Round-robin results

All draw times are listed in Alma-Ata Time (UTC+06:00).

Draw 1
Sunday, November 7, 9:00

Draw 2
Sunday, November 7, 14:00

Draw 3
Sunday, November 7, 19:00

Draw 4
Monday, November 8, 9:00

Draw 6
Monday, November 8, 19:00

Draw 8
Tuesday, November 9, 14:00

Draw 10
Wednesday, November 10, 9:00

Draw 12
Wednesday, November 10, 19:00

Draw 14
Thursday, November 11, 14:00

Playoffs

Semifinals
Friday, November 12, 9:00

Friday, November 12, 14:00

Bronze medal game
Saturday, November 13, 9:00

Gold medal game
Saturday, November 13, 14:00

Final standings

Women

Teams

The teams are listed as follows:

Round-robin standings
Final round-robin standings

Round-robin results

All draw times are listed in Alma-Ata Time (UTC+06:00).

Draw 1
Sunday, November 7, 9:00

Draw 2
Sunday, November 7, 14:00

Draw 3
Sunday, November 7, 19:00

Draw 4
Monday, November 8, 9:00

Draw 5
Monday, November 8, 14:00

Draw 7
Tuesday, November 9, 9:00

Draw 9
Tuesday, November 9, 19:00

Draw 11
Wednesday, November 10, 14:00

Draw 12
Wednesday, November 10, 19:00

Draw 13
Thursday, November 11, 9:00

Draw 15
Thursday, November 11, 19:00

Playoffs

Semifinals
Saturday, November 13, 9:00

Gold medal game
Saturday, November 13, 14:00

Final standings

References

External links

Pacific-Asia Curling Championships
Pacific-Asia Curling Championships
Pacific-Asia Curling Championships
Curling competitions in Kazakhstan
Sports competitions in Almaty